Black Castle Public House is a Grade I-listed building and public house on Junction Road in the Brislington suburb of the English city of Bristol. It is also known as Arno's Castle.

History
It was built in 1745—55 as a folly in the form of a castle which incorporated office spaces and recreation rooms, but may have originally been a stable block and laundry for the lord of the manor. The building was probably designed by either William Halfpenny or James Bridges, for the prominent local factory owner William Reeve of Mount Pleasant (now the Arno’s Court Hotel), from which it is separated by a major road junction. Reeve smelted brass and copper, and the Black Castle was built from blocks created from the waste slag.

Description
The Castle is built from pre-cast black copper-slag blocks from Reeve's foundry at Crew's Hole. Designed in Gothic Revival style, the building is symmetrical in plan with crenellated circular towers at each corner that link two-storey blocks to form a square courtyard. The front and back blocks have larger crenellated entrance towers with moulded archways through. Above the front arch is a blank panel with ogee head and a two-centre arch on the second storey with perpendicular tracery. The ranges to each side of the entrance have two windows with Y-tracery below a white string course and white carved inset panels. At the top of the ranges are light-coloured battlements with sunken panels.

The front corner towers have external entrances with two-centred archways and above them are prominent white flushwork panels, some of which are in the shape of crosses while others mimic arrow slits. A coach house extends from the right-hand corner tower at right angles to the main structure. It has a central two-centre archway front and back with similar small windows on both sides. Above the string course are round flushwork panels and the crenellated parapet is raised above the entrance.

Much of the freestone carving and dressings supposedly came from the city's demolished medieval gateways and St Werburghs Church, rebuilt by James Bridges in 1758—61. The building has been designated by Historic England as a Grade I-listed building. Arno's Court Triumphal Arch used to stand in front of the building, but was moved in 1912 to approximately 100 metres away.

References

See also
 Grade I listed buildings in Bristol

Pubs in Bristol
Grade I listed buildings in Bristol
Grade I listed pubs in England
Grade I listed stables
Buildings and structures completed in 1755
Folly castles in England